No defending champions were declared for this edition, as the 1981 Final match between Jimmy Connors and Guillermo Vilas was cancelled due to rain, with the score tied 5–5 in the first set.

Connors did not compete this year, while Vilas successfully managed to win the title, by defeating Ivan Lendl 6–1, 7–6, 6–3 in the final.

This was the only tournament that Björn Borg disputed in the entire season, and the last one before retiring from professional tennis in January 1983. Borg will eventually reach the quarterfinals, before losing to Yannick Noah in straight sets.

Seeds

Draw

Finals

Top half

Bottom half

References

External links
 Official results archive (ATP)
 Official results archive (ITF)

Monte Carlo Singles